The 2012 IPP Open was a professional tennis tournament played on hard courts. It was the 12th edition of the tournament which was part of the 2012 ATP Challenger Tour. It took place in Helsinki, Finland between 12 and 18 November 2012.

Singles main-draw entrants

Seeds

 1 Rankings are as of November 5, 2012.

Other entrants
The following players received wildcards into the singles main draw:
  Evgeny Donskoy
  Harri Heliövaara
  Jarkko Nieminen
  Alexander Rumyantsev

The following players received entry from the qualifying draw:
  Andis Juška
  Tim Pütz
  Andreas Vinciguerra
  Dzmitry Zhyrmont

The following players received entry into the singles main draw as a lucky loser:
  Evgeny Korolev

Champions

Singles

 Lukáš Lacko def.  Jarkko Nieminen, 6–3, 6–4

Doubles

 Mikhail Elgin /  Igor Zelenay def.  Uladzimir Ignatik /  Jimmy Wang, 4–6, 7–6(7–0), [10–4]

External links
Official Website

IPP Open
IPP Open